Pakistan–Sudan relations have been characterised as "close", "warm", "brotherly", and "cordial". Both, Pakistan and Sudan, share the same religion as well as historical baggage of colonial rule. Both countries are members of the Organisation of Islamic Cooperation, the Like Minded Group, and the Group of 77 in the United Nations.

Bilateral relations strengthened when Sudan declared its support for Pakistan in the Indo-Pakistani wars, and Pakistan stood by Sudan over its integrity and sovereignty, especially on its boundary disputes with both Egypt and South Sudan. Pakistan Armed Forces also contributed to the UN peacekeeping force in Sudan with 1,542 personnel and 92 observers during the Second Sudanese Civil War.

Through various memorandums of understanding, the two cooperate in the fields of agriculture, healthcare and education. Pakistan is also supporting Sudan with higher education as more than five hundred students from Sudan study in the universities of Pakistan which is the highest number of Sudanese students to any foreign country. In the past, Pakistan has offered medical training to Sudanese without any tuition fees. Sudan donated generously in the relief efforts during earthquake in 2005 and floods in 2010 in Pakistan. In turn, Pakistan has sent aid to Sudan during drought and famine. UNMIS Pakistani contingent regularly holds free clinics in remote areas of Blue Nile State that are currently inaccessible by land. In 2009, 37th such event was held near Ad-Damazin where over 1,500 patients were treated. In 2016, Senator Raja Zafar ul Haq inaugurated Pakistan–Sudan People's Friendship Association to promote opportunities for research, education, agriculture, health, business, trade, culture, tourism and youth cooperation. Around 2000 Pakistanis reside in Sudan and were involved in small businesses. As part of the commitment to Sudan, Pakistan Army sent a contingent of 202 soldiers to Sudan in May 2016 on UN's peacekeeping mission.

In 2014, President Mamnoon Hussain proposed a third round of Pakistan-Sudan Joint Ministerial Commission (JMC) to enhance cooperation in trade, economic and defence sectors. In 2016, the fourth round of bilateral political consultations between Pakistan and Sudan was held in Islamabad. The Undersecretary of the Ministry of Foreign Affairs of Sudan, Ambassador Abdul-Ghani Al-Naeim, met with Sartaj Aziz as Pakistan pursued 'Look Africa' policy. As part of the Africa policy, Pakistan seeks stronger relations with African countries through enhanced trade, investment and defence cooperation, establishing joint ventures and public-private partnership.

References

External links
 From Sudan: Thank you Pakistan!

 
Sudan
Sudan
Bilateral relations of Sudan